Robert Denholm "Bobby" Baxter (born 4 February 1937) is an English former professional footballer born in Redcar, Yorkshire, who played in the Football League for Darlington, Brighton & Hove Albion and Torquay United. He is the son and namesake of Scotland and Middlesbrough footballer Bobby Baxter.

Career
Baxter began his career by signing a professional contract on joining Darlington in November 1959. He began his professional career as a forward and was Darlington's top scorer for two seasons. After playing 64 league games and scoring 30 times he moved to Brighton & Hove Albion in June 1961 with Dennis Windross moving in the opposite direction. He had to wait until 25 November that year for his Brighton debut, at the Goldstone Ground against Preston North End. At Brighton he was converted to a wing half or full-back, and eventually made 195 league appearances, scoring six times, before moving to Torquay United in July 1967. He immediately settled into the Torquay first team at the start of the season, but lost his place when Bill Kitchener was signed on loan from West Ham United. Early in the following season, Kitchener signed permanently for Torquay and Baxter again lost his place. However, Baxter regained his place in the first team when Kitchener was switched to the centre of defence after the career-ending injury received by Torquay defender Alan Smith. After appearing in 62 league games (scoring six goals) for the Gulls, Baxter returned to Darlington in July 1969, playing just one further season in the football league before joining non-league Plymouth City in July 1970.

In September 2001, Baxter, still a Torbay resident, returned to Plainmoor as a match summariser for BBC Radio for the game between Torquay and Scunthorpe United.

References

External links
 

1937 births
Living people
People from Redcar
English footballers
Darlington F.C. players
Brighton & Hove Albion F.C. players
Torquay United F.C. players
English Football League players
Footballers from Yorkshire
Association football fullbacks
Association football inside forwards
English people of Scottish descent